The name Lily has been used for three tropical cyclones in the Eastern Pacific Ocean.

 Hurricane Lily (1967)
 Hurricane Lily (1971)
 Hurricane Lily (1975)

See also 
 List of storms named Lili, an alternate spelling of the name also used

Pacific hurricane set index articles